Uruguay competed at the 1976 Summer Olympics in Montreal, Quebec, Canada. Nine competitors, seven men and two women, took part in nine events in five sports.

Athletics

Ana María Desevici

Boxing

Juan Scassino

Cycling

Five cyclists represented Uruguay in 1976.

Individual road race
 Carlos Alcantara — did not finish (→ no ranking)
 Víctor González — did not finish (→ no ranking)
 Waldemar Pedrazzi — did not finish (→ no ranking)
 Washington Díaz — did not finish (→ no ranking)

1000m time trial
 Miguel Margalef — 1:11.905 (→ 22nd place)

Individual pursuit
 Washington Díaz — 21st place

Team pursuit
 Washington Díaz
 Víctor González
 Miguel Margalef
 Waldemar Pedrazzi

Rowing

Reinaldo Kutscher

Swimming

Elena Ospitaleche

References

External links
Montevideo.com
Official Olympic Reports

Nations at the 1976 Summer Olympics
1976 Summer Olympics
1976 in Uruguayan sport